Diego Oliveira Silva (born 26 December 1990 in São Paulo) is a Brazilian professional footballer who plays as a forward for Thai League 2 club Chainat Hornbill.

Club career

Brazil
Diego Silva was born in Guarulhos. In 2009, he joined Guarulhos Academy in Brazil, then signed his first professional contract with AD Guarulhos in 2011. In 2013, he moved to Parana and signed with GRECAL, and later moved to Santacruzense in 2014.

Antigua and Barbuda
In 2014, he moved to Antigua and Barbuda and signed with Five Islands. After an impressive season he gained interest from other Antigua and Barbuda clubs, and chose Parham.

Dong Thap
In 2016, Diego received an offer from Vietnam club Dong Thap. After one season with Đồng Tháp in Vietnam, he moved to Thailand.

Nonthaburi United S.Boonmeerit 
In 2017, Diego signed with Bangkok based club Nonthaburi United S.Boonmeerit. In 2017 Thai League 4 Western Region, Diego scored 13 goals in the season and Nonthaburi United S.Boonmeerit gained promotion to Thai League 3. Diego became the top scorer in the league and received an offer from Nakhon Pathom United.

Nakhon Pathom United
In 2018, Diego Silva signed with Thai League 4 side Nakhon Pathom United and gained promotion to Thai League 3. He was the top scorer for Nakhon Pathom, scoring 29 goals, and signed another season contract. In 2019, Diego again became the top scorer in Thai League 3 as well, scoring 13 goals. Nakhon Pathom won Thai League 3 and was promoted to Thai League 2.

Haiphong
After an impressive performance in Nakhon Pathom's 2019, Diego joined Vietnamese club Haiphong in January 2020.

Career statistics

Honours

BTU United
Thai League 4: 2017

NakhonPathom United
Thai League 4: 2018
Thai League 3: 2019

Individual
Thai League 4 top scorer: 2017
Thai League 4 top scorer: 2018
Thai League 3 top scorer: 2019
Thai League 3 MVP: 2019

References 

Living people
1990 births
Brazilian footballers
Association football forwards
Nonthaburi United S.Boonmeerit F.C. players
Diego Silva
Dong Thap FC players
Haiphong FC players
V.League 1 players
Diego Silva
Brazilian expatriate footballers
Brazilian expatriate sportspeople in Vietnam
Expatriate footballers in Vietnam
Footballers from São Paulo
Nakhon Si United F.C. players